Ronaldo Joybera Junior Kwateh (born 19 October 2004) is an Indonesian professional footballer who plays as a winger or forward for Turkish First League club Bodrumspor and the Indonesia national team.

Club career

Madura United
He was signed for Madura United to play in Liga 1 in the 2021 season. Kwateh made his first-team debut on 3 September 2021 in a match against Persikabo 1973 at the Indomilk Arena, Tangerang. In that match, he made history by becoming the youngest player to debut in Liga 1, at that time, he appeared at the age of 16 years old, 10 months and 15 days, This achievement made him beat Mochammad Supriadi's previous record. On 12 December, Kwateh scored his first professional league goal for the club in a 1–3 lose over Bali United at Maguwoharjo Stadium.

Bodrumspor 
On 15 February 2023, Kwateh officially joined Turkish First League side Bodrumspor on a permanent deal, signing a contract until June 2025.

International career
In October 2021, Kwateh was called up to the Indonesia U23 in a friendly match against Tajikistan and Nepal and also prepared for 2022 AFC U-23 Asian Cup qualification in Tajikistan. On 26 October 2021, Kwateh debuted in a youth national team when he came on as a substitute in a 2–3 loss against Australia U23 in the 2022 AFC U-23 Asian Cup qualification. Kwateh also was part of the Indonesia U23 team that won bronze in the 2021 Southeast Asian Games; he scored a goal in the third-place match against Malaysia.

In January 2022, Kwateh was called up to the Indonesian senior team for two friendly matches against Timor Leste in Bali by coach Shin Tae-yong. On 27 January 2022, he earned his maiden senior cap in a 4–1 win in the first of those two matches and broke the record for the youngest player to represent his country in a senior match at the age of 17 years 104 days.

Career statistics

Club

Notes

International

International goals
International under-20 goals

International under-23 goals

Honours
Indonesia U-23
 Southeast Asian Games  Bronze medal: 2021

Personal life
Ronaldo is the son of Roberto Kwateh, a Liberian footballer who played for PSIS Semarang.

References

External links
 Ronaldo Kwateh at Soccerway
 Ronaldo Kwateh at Liga Indonesia

2004 births
Living people
People from Bantul Regency
Indonesian people of Liberian descent
Sportspeople of Liberian descent
Sportspeople from Special Region of Yogyakarta
Indonesian footballers
Indonesia youth international footballers
Indonesia international footballers
Liga 1 (Indonesia) players
Madura United F.C. players
Association football forwards
Competitors at the 2021 Southeast Asian Games
Southeast Asian Games bronze medalists for Indonesia
Southeast Asian Games medalists in football